Uspensky District is an administrative district (raion), one of the thirty-eight in Krasnodar Krai, Russia. As a municipal division, it is incorporated as Uspensky Municipal District. It is located in the east of the krai. Its administrative center is the rural locality (a selo) of Uspenskoye. Population:  The population of Uspenskoye accounts for 30.1% of the district's total population.

References

Notes

Sources

Districts of Krasnodar Krai